The Sea of Grass is a 1947 American Western film set in the American Southwest. It was directed by Elia Kazan and based on the 1936 novel of the same name by Conrad Richter. The film stars Katharine Hepburn, Spencer Tracy, and Melvyn Douglas.

Kazan was reportedly displeased with the resulting film and discouraged people from seeing it.

Plot summary
The film opens in St. Louis, Missouri, on Lutie Cameron's (Katharine Hepburn) wedding day. She has had a short courtship with a cattle rancher of New Mexico. As she dresses, she receives a telegram from her fiancé Col. Brewton (Spencer Tracy) telling her to board the train for New Mexico to marry him in the small town of Salt Fork. The first person she meets in town is Brice Chamberlain (Melvyn Douglas), who warns her of likely unhappiness with Brewton, locally considered a tyrant. He takes her to the courthouse, where she sees Brewton testifying against a settler who had tried to stake a claim to part of the government-owned land where Brewton runs his cattle.

Back at the ranch, Brewton takes her out to see the vast prairie. He explains how he had fought with Indians to run his cattle there and to make it fit for ranching. He runs his cattle on government-owned land, and opposes homesteaders because he believes the Great Plains do not get enough rain to sustain farming. Lutie struggles to understand Brewton's attraction to the forbidding prairie, but she tries to make the most of her new home.

She persuades Brewton to allow a family of settlers onto the ranch, because she had befriended one of them. Brewton warns her that the settlers will not last more than six months, due to some unforeseeable, but certain, circumstance. When Lutie visits the settlers as they build their sod house, she is surprised to see Chamberlain. He is visiting the settlers because he had helped them file their claim on the land. He rides with Lutie on her way back home and confesses his attraction to her. Lutie confesses her struggles to adapt to her new home and her husband's emotional distance. Lutie gives birth to a daughter, Sara Beth.

During a great blizzard, the settlers are alarmed by the sound of Brewton's cattle near their house. Fearful for his wheat crop, knowing its destruction would spell the ruin of his farm, the man goes out of the house with his rifle, planning to scare off the cattle. When they stampede, he shoots and kills one of the cows; he also wounds one of Brewton's cowboys, who were trying to herd the cattle in the storm. The rest of the ranch hands severely beat the farmer. His pregnant wife goes into the fierce storm to help him inside and loses her baby. When Lutie learns of the incident, she rides quickly out to the settlers' house, but they refuse to see her. Having lost their crop and baby, they are broken and concede the land to Brewton.

Brewton tells Lutie that he had warned her the settlers faced severe challenges. Furious with him, Lutie decides to leave Salt Fork for a while. She goes to Denver. While planning to return to St. Louis, she runs into Chamberlain. The two have a discreet affair, and Lutie decides to return to Brewton. After her return to Salt Fork, she gives birth to a boy, whom she names Brock. She continues to struggle in Brewton's world.

Chamberlain successfully lobbies for a Federal District Court in Salt Fork, and he wins election as its judge. He will preside over land disputes, which increase as the government encourages homesteading. Brewton believes that Chamberlain will decide in favor of settlers on "his" land. As he arms himself and his men to ward off the settlers, Lutie pleads with him to reconsider. They argue in the abandoned sod house, where Brewton prepares his ammunition, and he gets Lutie to confess to the affair with Chamberlain. She agrees to leave, but Brewton refuses to let her take the two children.

Back in St. Louis, she consults a lawyer. He says that if she testifies in court that Chamberlain is Brock's father, she could win custody of her son, but she would certainly lose custody of Sara Beth. Convinced that fighting would cause too much damage to her children, Lutie stays away. She returns after two years in a futile attempt to reconnect with them, who no longer recognize her. Chamberlain tries to get her to fight for Brock's custody so they can run away together as a family, but Lutie says that she does not love him enough to marry him.

As the years pass, the town doctor keeps Lutie informed about her children through letters. On his deathbed, he chides Brewton for driving Lutie away by his emotional distance. After the doctor's death, Chamberlain takes up the correspondence to tell Lutie about her children. He shares his concerns that Brock has grown into a reckless young man, too endowed with charm and luck.

For years, Brock has endured taunts from townsfolk about his "real father," but the truth has never been acknowledged outright. During a card game, his opponent refers repeatedly to Brock only as "judge", referring to Chamberlain. Brock gets drawn into conflict and, when his opponent draws his pistol, Brock shoots him fatally in the stomach. Once Brock is bailed out of jail, he returns home and confesses the incident to his father and sister. Brewton insists that Brock return to town and stand trial. In private, Brock confesses to his sister that he could not stand a trial because it would bring up the reason for the fight, and humiliate their father. Brock decides to flee, and the sheriff pursues him with a posse. Brewton goes after him when Sara Beth tells why Brock skipped bail.

Brewton reaches the cabin where the posse is exchanging gunfire with Brock, who is holed up inside. When Brewton enters the cabin, he finds his son fatally shot.

Having read in the newspaper that Brock was on the run, Lutie returns by train to Salt Fork. Just before arriving, she learns that he has been killed. She decides to keep traveling to San Francisco later that night. In town, she sees Brewton escorting Brock's body to the church, and she hides from view.

Sara Beth visits her mother in her hotel room, warning her against trying to see Brewton and stirring up more trouble. Lutie tells Sara Beth that she is glad that Brewton will have his daughter to love him. Sara Beth breaks down and invites her mother back to the house, where she reconciles with Brewton.

Cast
 Spencer Tracy as Colonel Jim Brewton
 Katharine Hepburn as Lutie Cameron
 Robert Walker as Brock
 Melvyn Douglas as Brice Chamberlain
 Phyllis Thaxter as Sara Beth
 Edgar Buchanan as Jeff
 Harry Carey as Doc Reid
 Charles Trowbridge as	George Cameron
 Russell Hicks	as Maj. Dell Harney
 Trevor Bardette as Andy Boggs
 Robert Barrat as Judge Seth White 
 Morris Ankrum as A.J. Crane
 Ruth Nelson as Selina Hall
 George Reed as Uncle Nat (uncredited)

Production
In his autobiography, Kazan wrote that he had been excited at the prospect of filming The Sea of Grass, as he was looking forward to working on the Great Plains, "where the grass still grew from unbroken sod." However, the producers decided that the majority of the film would be shot against a process screen to use some of the existing "ten thousand feet" of 'sea of grass' stock footage, rather than sending the film crew on location. According to The Films of Katharine Hepburn, MGM had thousands of reels of footage of prairie. Kazan was extremely disappointed. He also did not like the costumes, which he did not get to see until late in the process. He thought the producers had approved clothes for Katharine Hepburn that in design and quantity did not fit the frontier environment, but changes were restricted due to production deadlines.
The 'Sea of Grass' scenes used as process screen backdrop were shot in the Sandhills of Nebraska on the ranch of former Nebraska Governor Samuel McKelvie. There is no little irony that a story based in New Mexico exclaiming the Great Plains are cattle country was using a backdrop that later became part of the McKelvie National Forest.

The production was planned for Myrna Loy and Spencer Tracy at the beginning.

Reception
Although it received mostly tepid critical reviews, the movie was the most commercially successful of all the Hepburn-Tracy MGM films, making $3,150,000 in the US and Canada and $1,539,000 overseas. This resulted in a profit to MGM of $742,000. Kazan did not like his final product, and advised friends against seeing it.

Notes

External links

 
 The Sea of Grass at the TCM Movie Database
 
 

1947 films
American black-and-white films
1940s English-language films
Films based on American novels
Films directed by Elia Kazan
Metro-Goldwyn-Mayer films
Films about farmers
Films set on farms
Films set in New Mexico
Films scored by Herbert Stothart
1947 Western (genre) films
American Western (genre) films
1940s American films